F for Fake ("Truths and lies") is a 1973 docudrama film co-written, directed by, and starring Orson Welles who worked on the film alongside François Reichenbach, Oja Kodar, and Gary Graver. Initially released in 1974, it focuses on Elmyr de Hory's recounting of his career as a professional art forger; de Hory's story serves as the backdrop for a meandering investigation of the natures of authorship and authenticity, as well as the basis of the value of art. Far from serving as a traditional documentary on de Hory, the film also incorporates Welles's companion Oja Kodar, hoax biographer Clifford Irving, and Orson Welles as himself. F for Fake is sometimes considered an example of a film essay.

In addition to the 88-minute film, in 1976 Welles also shot and edited a self-contained 9-minute short film as a "trailer", almost entirely composed of original material not found in the main film itself.

Plot 
The film opens with Welles performing magic tricks for some children while Kodar watches nearby.  Welles quotes Robert-Houdin to the effect that a magician is just an actor.  Welles promises that for the next hour everything in the film will be based on solid fact.  Kodar is then shown strolling around a street in a miniskirt while being ogled by the men on the street.  Welles reveals the footage is taken from another experiment about girl-watching, where Kodar deliberately drew attention to herself and the men were unaware they were being filmed.  Welles says her story will continue later in the film, and then narrates the story of Elmyr de Hory, an art forger who sold many fake paintings to museums and collectors all over the world.  De Hory is shown throwing a dinner party at his home in Ibiza and being feted by European society, although he dances around the question of whether he is guilty or not.  One of those filmed is Clifford Irving, who had published a biography of de Hory called Fake, and was later revealed to have been the forger of a fake "authorized biography" of Howard Hughes.  Welles discusses the irony of Irving commenting on de Hory's forgery while having committed a version of it himself (Welles states his belief that Irving must have been in the process of working on the hoax at the time he was filmed for the de Hory project).  Irving and de Hory tell about the art dealers who were fooled by the forgeries, and Welles considers the question whether this means art dealers and appraisers are fake also.

Welles presents more of Irving's story of having had secret contact with Hughes, and the odd stories of Hughes's behavior that may or may not have been true.  He wonders if believing such stories makes a person credulous or not, and questions the true wisdom of so-called experts, who verified Irving's forgery as authentic.  Reichenbach is shown telling how de Hory provided him with several paintings of questionable authenticity, but the art dealers he gave them to were willfully blind to it.  Welles notes that de Hory does not even own the house he lives in; it is provided for him by an art dealer.  Welles recounts his own past use of fakery: how he got a job in Ireland by falsely claiming to be a famous New York actor, and how his broadcast of The War of the Worlds made deliberate use of fake news to enhance the story.  He also notes the coincidence that his first film Citizen Kane was originally going to be a fictionalized version of Howard Hughes.

Irving describes how de Hory was nearly destitute when younger and subsisted in America by making and selling forgeries that were indistinguishable from the real works, while remaining one step ahead of the law through frequent relocations.  He finally moved to Ibiza, but was not prosecuted for lack of witnesses to the actual forging, as well as the scandal that might be aroused by revealing the depth of the art market's complicity in the deception. de Hory insists he never signed any forgery, and Welles wonders whether, given the fact that all art eventually falls away to ruin, a signature truly matters to any art work. He illustrates the point by shots of the cathedral of Chartres, pointing out that the names of the men who created the magnificent building and the sculptures which adorn it are unknown. They did not sign their work, but it has endured.

Welles finally presents Kodar's story: she holidayed in the same village as Picasso, who noticed her and painted 22 pieces with her as the model.  She insisted she be allowed to keep the paintings, but later when Picasso read about an acclaimed exhibit of 22 new pieces of his, he flew there in a rage, only to discover the pieces were all forgeries.  Kodar took Picasso to her grandfather, the forger. In a verbal re-enactment by Welles (grandfather) and Kodar (Picasso), the forger defended his work with pride, saying he invented a new Picasso period. The grandfather suggests that the forgeries go un-reported, to allow him an artistic legacy that Picasso already has. Picasso angrily demanded the paintings back, which is impossible because the grandfather had burned them. Welles then confesses that he had promised everything in the "next hour" was true, and that hour had already passed.  He admits the entire story of Kodar, her grandfather, and Picasso was made up.  He apologizes, quotes Picasso's statement that art is a lie that makes us see the truth, and bids the audience good evening.

Cast 

 Orson Welles – Himself
 Elmyr de Hory – The Art Forger
 Oja Kodar – The Girl
 Joseph Cotten – Special Participant
 François Reichenbach – Special Participant
 Richard Wilson – Special Participant
 Paul Stewart – Special Participant
 Mark Forgy – Assistant to Elmyr de Hory
 Alexander Welles – Special Participant (as Sasa Devcic)
 Gary Graver – Special Participant
 Andrés Vicente Gómez – Special Participant
 Julio Palinkas – Special Participant
 Christian Odasso – Special Participant
 Françoise Widhoff – Special Participant

Others 
 Peter Bogdanovich – Special Participant (voice)
 William Alland – Special Participant (voice)
 Howard Hughes - Himself (uncredited)
 Jean-Pierre Aumont – Himself (uncredited)
 Laurence Harvey – Himself (uncredited)
 Clifford Irving – Himself (uncredited)
 Nina van Pallandt – Herself (uncredited)

Background 
Orson Welles was hired to edit a documentary by François Reichenbach about the art forger Elmyr de Hory.  The film grew over time to encompass de Hory, as well as de Hory's biographer Clifford Irving, who was revealed to be a forger himself. Keith Woodward explains: "following Irving’s hoax, Welles and his cinematographer, Gary Graver, shifted gears, scrambling to keep up with the Hughes affair, adding new shots, re-thinking the narrative, re-editing, re-combining different themes, incorporating emerging material." Welles used these circumstances to produce a meditation on the nature of fakery, which he called " a new kind of movie … it’s a form, in other words, the essay, the personal essay, as opposed to the documentary."

Several storylines are presented in the film, including those of de Hory, Irving, Welles, Howard Hughes and Kodar.  About de Hory, we learn that he was a struggling artist who turned to forgery out of desperation, only to see the greater share of the profits from his deceptions go to doubly unscrupulous art dealers. As partial compensation for that injustice, he is maintained in a villa in Ibiza by one of his dealers. What is only hinted at in Welles's documentary is that de Hory had recently served a two-month sentence in a Spanish prison for homosexuality and consorting with criminals. (de Hory would commit suicide two years after the initial release of Welles's film, on hearing that Spain had agreed to turn him over to the French authorities.)

Irving's original part in F for Fake was as de Hory's biographer, but his part grew unexpectedly at some point during production. There has not always been agreement among commentators over just how that production unfolded, but the now-accepted story is that the director François Reichenbach shot a documentary about de Hory and Irving before giving his footage to Welles, who then shot additional footage with Reichenbach as his cinematographer.

In the time between the shooting of Reichenbach's documentary and the finishing of Welles's, it became known that Irving had perpetrated a hoax of his own, namely a fabricated "authorized biography" of Howard Hughes (the hoax was later fictionalized in The Hoax). This discovery prompted the shooting of still more footage, which then got woven into F for Fake. Interweaving the narratives even more, there are several pieces of footage in the film showing Welles at a party with De Hory, and, at one point, De Hory even signs a painting with a forgery of Welles's signature. Some of Hughes's career is outlined in the form of a parody of the "News on the March" sequence in Citizen Kane. Welles also draws parallels between the De Hory and Irving hoaxes and his own brush with early notoriety by including a recreation of part of his 1938 War of the Worlds radio drama, which had simulated a newscast about a Martian invasion and sparked panic among some listeners.

The story about Kodar, her grandfather, and Picasso and some forger paintings that the grandfather supposedly made is presented at the end of the film before Welles reminds the viewer that he only promised to tell the truth for an hour and that "for the last 17 minutes, I've been lying my head off."  In the commentary to the Criterion Collection DVD release of F for Fake, Kodar claims the idea for this segment as her own. She also claims credit for the movie's opening sequence, which consists of shots of a miniskirt-clad Kodar walking down streets while rubbernecking male admirers (unaware that they are being filmed) stop and openly stare. This sequence is described by Kodar as inspired by her feminism; in his narration, Welles claims the footage was originally shot for an unrelated production.

Locations 

Rome, Italy – Girl-watching sequence
Ibiza, Spain – 16 mm elements from the original Reichenbach documentary
Paris, France – Gare d'Austerlitz, Champ de Mars, art gallery on left bank, La Méditerranée seafood restaurant
Los Angeles – The Beverly Hills Hotel – The ham sandwich of Howard Hughes
Chartres Cathedral – France
 Orvilliers, France – Orson Welles and Oja Kodar house—editing-room scenes, set for various indoor scenes
 Houdan, France – Oja and Picasso story
 Paris-Orly Airport – South terminal terrace and main hall

Trailer 
F for Fake was not released in the USA until 1976. When it finally came out, Welles produced a preview "trailer" for it, which was effectively a wholly original 9-minute film, shot and edited in a similar style to the film itself. Apart from some very brief split-second camera shots, the entire film is a self-contained short containing original material starring Welles, Gary Graver and Oja Kodar. The trailer raises new questions about key people in the main film: Picasso, Kodar, Elmyr, and others. These allegations are supposedly revealed in the main film. They include a wig, Oja Kodar's fake name, her tiger (not shown in the film at all), and extraterrestrial sponsors of Welles's War of the Worlds broadcast. The trailer has subsequently been restored in colour, and is included as an extra on some DVD versions of the film.

Reception 
F for Fake faced widespread popular rejection. Critical reaction ranged from praise to confusion and hostility, with many finding the work to be self-indulgent or incoherent. F for Fake has grown somewhat in stature over the years. The film embraces ideas from the self-conscious notation of the film process to the ironic employment of 1950s-era B movie footage (Earth vs. the Flying Saucers). Welles thought he was creating a new form of cinema. When writer Jonathan Rosenbaum asked Welles if he was creating a documentary, he replied, “No, not a documentary—a new kind of film."

On review aggregator Rotten Tomatoes, the film has an approval rating of 88% based on 50 reviews, with an average rating of 7.79/10. The website's critical consensus reads, "F for Fake playfully poses intriguing questions while proving that even Orson Welles' minor works contain their share of masterful moments." In July 2021, the film was shown in the Cannes Classics section at the 2021 Cannes Film Festival.

Questions of truthfulness 
Author Robert Anton Wilson, a great fan of the film, argued in Cosmic Trigger III: My Life After Death that the film was itself largely an intentional effort at fakery by Welles in support of the film's themes. Most directly, Wilson reports that in the BBC documentary Orson Welles: Stories of a Life in Film, Welles stated that "everything in that film was a trick."  Secondly, many of the interviews in the film were with people who were themselves directly involved with forgery in one way or another, often making statements that would have been known by the filmmakers to be false, but which were allowed to pass without comment in the film. Similarly, Welles himself made numerous false statements about Oja Kodar in the film. Finally, Wilson points out several scenes which, while presented in a way that implies they were filmed in real time, were upon further inspection clearly fabricated from unrelated pieces of footage in a way guaranteed to mislead the casual viewer. An example of this appears with a series of near-wordless shots of Irving and de Hory seemingly in debate as to whether de Hory ever signed his forgeries; the shots of Irving and de Hory were in fact taken at different times.

Welles's autobiographical asides in the film reflect on his 1938 radio adaptation of The War of the Worlds, which he alleges caused a nationwide panic with its fake news broadcast. In introducing this chapter of his life, Welles declares his uncertainty as to his own authenticity, as he believes he too has engaged in fraud. While the basic facts of The War of the Worlds incident are correctly given, the apparent excerpts from the play featured in the movie are fabrications, including a scene in which President Roosevelt meets the Martian invaders—something which did not happen in the original broadcast.

Home-video releases 
 1995 Home Vision Cinema, Janus Films VHS (FAK 010), 25 July 1995
 2005 The Criterion Collection, Region 1 DVD (Spine #288), 26 April 2005 – Two-disc special edition including audio commentary by Oja Kodar and Gary Graver, an introduction by Peter Bogdanovich, and the documentary Orson Welles: One-Man Band (1995)
 2009 Madman Entertainment Directors Suite, Region 4 DVD, 20 May 2009 – Special features include audio commentary by Adrian Martin, Monash University, and the documentary Orson Welles: One-Man Band (1995)
 2010 Eureka Video: Masters of Cinema, Region 2 DVD (Spine #31) – Special features include audio commentary by cinematographer Gary Graver and Bill Krohn, and Jonathan Rosenbaum on F For Fake

See also
 Me and Orson Welles - a fictionalized retelling of the life of Orson Welles. Directed by Richard Linklater, starring Zac Efron 
 Someone to Love - a 1987 pseudo-documentary directed by Henry Jaglom about a filmmaker who throws a Valentine's Day party at an old movie theater that is about to be demolished and then quizzes his guests on camera about their lives.
 Filming Othello – a 1978 documentary film directed by and starring Orson Welles about the making of his 1951 production Othello.
 Hello Cinema – a 1995 Iranian docufiction film that shows various everyday people being auditioned and explaining their reason for wanting to act in a film.

Bibliography 
 Claudia Thieme, F for Fake: And the Growth in Complexity of Orson Welles' Documentary Form (Peter Lang Pub., 1997) 174pp.

References

External links 

 
 
 
 "F for Fake Is an Illusionist's Trick With Bogus Heroes and Expert Villains" by Vincent Canby, New York Times, 28 September 1975
 "F for Fake: The Ultimate Mirror of Orson Welles" Article by Robert Castle, August 2004
F for Fake: Orson Welles’s Purloined Letter an essay by Jonathan Rosenbaum at the Criterion Collection

1973 films
1973 documentary films
American avant-garde and experimental films
1970s French-language films
1970s Spanish-language films
Documentary films about the visual arts
Films about con artists
Films directed by Orson Welles
Films shot in France
Films shot in Germany
Films about art forgery
Literary forgeries
Document forgery
Fiction with unreliable narrators
Films scored by Michel Legrand
Films shot in Almería
1970s avant-garde and experimental films
1970s English-language films
1970s American films